At least three ships of the Imperial Russian Navy have been named Askold after the semi-legendary rulers of Kiev, Askold and Dir.

  – a 46-gun frigate stricken in 1861 and subsequently broken up.
  – a 17-gun corvette stricken in 1893 and  sold for scrap in 1901.
  – a protected cruiser that participated in the Battle of the Yellow Sea during the Russo-Japanese War. Scrapped in 1922.

Civilian ships
  - a freight steamboat of Russian Steam Navigation and Trading Company, etc.  (1879–1928, till 1886 freight steamboat named Astrakhan)

References 

Russian Navy ship names